Whalebone is the sixth studio release Marc Douglas Berardo. All songs were written by Berardo with the exception of "My Mistakes", which was co-written with Abbie Gardner of Red Molly, and "Silvermine Daydreamin'", which was written by Chris Berardo.

John Apice from No Depression called it "a highly polished personal collection in the tradition of many clever songwriters of the past that forged songs like short stories."

Track listing
 "Don't Wait For Me (Slow You Down)" 
 "Sorting Out What Happened in the Night)" 
 "Your Are Already Gone"
 "Hotel on the Bay"
 "My Mistakes"
 "With Every Passing Day" 
 "My Friend"
 "Silvermine Daydreamin'"
 "Our Troubles"
 "This is What I Call Fun" 
 "Lightning"
 "It's Love"
 "Wherever I Go"
 "Another Song"

Personnel

Musicians
 Marc Douglas Berardo – vocals, background vocals, guitar, percussion, Lincoln Schleifler-Bass
 Dick Neal – electric guitars
 Paulie Triff – drums
 Arturo Baguer – upright bass
 Craig Aiken – bass
 Jordan Jancz – bass
 Liam Bailey – banjo, fiddles
 Chris Berardo – vocals, harmonica, tambourine, percussion, background vocals, scat vocals, harmony vocals, shaker, block
 John Juxo – accordion, organ, keyboard, piano, Rhodes piano
 Abbie Gardner – lap steel guitar, Dobro, vocals, background vocals
 Jon Pousette-Dart of the Pousette-Dart Band – electric guitar

Production
Produced by: Chris Berardo
Recorded by: Mark Dann Recording. Additional recording in Stratford, Connecticut
Mixed by: Dick Neal and Chris Berardo
Mastered by: Mark Dann New York City March 2013

Artwork
Photography: Kim Mitchell
Whale Bone Drawing – Leslie Bender 
Graphic Design and Layout: Marc Douglas Berardo and Chris Brown

References

2013 albums
Marc Douglas Berardo albums